Bagabag Central School (Filipino: Mababang Paaralan ng Bagabag) is primary and intermediate public school located at San Pedro, Bagabag, Nueva Vizcaya, Philippines. It is the main public school of the town of Bagabag established in the 1930s.

The Bagabag Central School Hymn, entitled Bagabag Central School, Beloved Alma Mater, was composed by Maria Luisa dela Cueva Cabading-Pallanan on August, 2006. She is a Music teacher of Bagabag Central School and resident of Bagabag, Nueva Vizcaya.

Schools in Nueva Vizcaya